Spaziphora hydromyzina is a species of fly in the family Scathophagidae. It is found in the Palearctic.

References

Scathophagidae
Palearctic insects
Insects described in 1819